Trimeresurus yunnanensis, commonly known as the Yunnan bamboo pitviper, is a venomous pitviper species endemic to China.

Description
The scalation includes 19 (or 21) rows of dorsal scales at midbody, 154-164/150-172 ventral scales in males/females, 61-71/52-65 subcaudal scales in males/females, and 9-11 supralabial scales.

Geographic range
It is found in southern China (Yunnan and southwestern Sichuan). The type locality given is "Tengyueh, Yunnan Province, China" (= Tengchong County).

Taxonomy
Zhao (1995) raised this taxon back up to the level of a full species: T. yunnanensis.

References

Further reading
 Schmidt, K.P. 1925. New Reptiles and a New Salamander from China. American Museum Novitates (157): 1–5. ("Trimeresurus yunnanensis, new species", pp. 4–5.)

yunnanensis
Fauna of Yunnan
Reptiles of China
Endemic fauna of China
Taxa named by Karl Patterson Schmidt